Zdzisław Myrda (29 January 1951 – 6 July 2020) was a Polish basketball player. He competed in the men's tournament at the 1980 Summer Olympics.

Myrda died on 6 July 2020 at the age of 69.

References

External links
 
 
 

1951 births
2020 deaths
Polish men's basketball players
Olympic basketball players of Poland
Basketball players at the 1980 Summer Olympics
People from Rzeszów County
Sportspeople from Podkarpackie Voivodeship